Lenti is a town in Zala County,  Hungary, located near the border with Austria, Slovenia and Croatia.

Gallery

Famous inhabitants 
József Sári (1935-), composer
László Lackner (1943-), writer

International relations

Twin towns — Sister cities
Lenti is twinned with Bad Radkersburg, Austria, and Lendava, Slovenia.

Sports
The local sports team is Lenti TE.

External links

  in Hungarian, English and German
 Aerial photographs of Lenti

Populated places in Zala County